Vitali Aleksandrovich Baganov (born 6 September 1952) is a Russian actor of film and television currently based in the United States who guest starred as Valery the Russian gangster in The Sopranos episodes Pine Barrens and ...To Save Us All from Satan's Power. Baganov also voiced Ray Bulgarin in Grand Theft Auto IV and The Ballad of Gay Tony.

Biography
Vitali Baganov was born in Leningrad, Russian RSFSR, Soviet Union (now Saint Petersburg, Russia)

Baganov studied astronomy in Leningrad State University then transferred to the Leningrad State Institute for Theatre, Music and Cinematography. After graduation, he worked at Memorial Lenin Komsomol Theatre and Komissarjevsky Theatre. He was filmed in a number of Soviet films. In 1991 he emigrated to the United States.

Along with The Sopranos Baganov has appeared in the US television series Louie and The Americans.

Filmography
 1979 Sherlock Holmes and Doctor Watson: The Bloody Inscription as himself credited as (V. Baganaov) 
 1979 Inzhener Graffito as himself 
 1984 Sneg v iyule as Sergey Zherdin
 1984 Doronga k sebe as Lyoahka
 1984 Nebyvalshchina as Soldier
 1986 Na ostriya Mecha as himself
 1988 Shchenok as himself
 1989 V znak protesta as himself
 2001 The Sopranos as Valery
 2010 Salt as new Russian president
 2018 The Americans (2018) as Stepan

References

External links

1952 births
Male actors from Saint Petersburg
Soviet male film actors
Soviet male television actors
Russian State Institute of Performing Arts alumni
Living people
Soviet emigrants to the United Kingdom
British expatriates in the United States